The First Presidency of Community of Christ, formerly the Reorganized Church of Jesus Christ of Latter Day Saints, is the church's highest-ranking priesthood quorum. It is composed of the Prophet-President and two counselors, and they preside over the whole church under the principles of "theocratic democracy" observed in the governance of the church. This includes responsibility for the World Conference, field ministries, priesthood quorums and orders, and headquarters functions. The president of the Church holds the priesthood office of Prophet and is also a High Priest.

In 1860 with the reorganization of the First Presidency, Joseph Smith III became the second prophet-president of this church and also president of a new First Presidency. William Marks became Smith's First Counselor.

In Community of Christ, each new church president has generally been "designated" as the successor by the preceding church president. The counselors in the First Presidency are then chosen by the church president and are often, but not required, to be former or current members of the Council of Twelve Apostles. In addition, the death or resignation of the Prophet-President does not dissolve the First Presidency, which continues on as the church's executive council in the persons of the remaining two presidents until a Prophet-President is called. The two members who were counselors to the prophet-president cease to be counselors during this time. Upon ordination of the Prophet-President, the former First Presidency is dissolved, and upon ordination of the two counselors, it is reorganized. Members of the First Presidency are not members of the Quorum of Twelve nor do they hold the priesthood office of apostle, regardless of previous calling.

Prior to 1996, all prophet-presidents were descendants of the movement's founder, Joseph Smith Jr. This pattern was broken by Wallace B. Smith, who designated W. Grant McMurray church president. McMurray, in turn, resigned the church presidency in 2004 without designating a successor. A joint council of church leaders led by the Council of Twelve Apostles announced in March 2005 that Stephen M. Veazey was selected as Prophet-President designate. Veazey had been serving as president of the Council of Twelve. Delegates elected to a special World Conference of the church approved Veazey and he was ordained as the 8th president of the High Priesthood, Prophet, and President of the Church on June 3, 2005.

At the 2007 World Conference, Becky L. Savage was ordained as the first woman to serve in the First Presidency.

Current members of the First Presidency are:

President Stephen M. Veazey, President of the Church
President Stassi D. Cramm (Counselor to the president)
President K. Scott Murphy (Counselor to the president)

Chronology

During the lifetime of Joseph Smith Jr.
Both the Community of Christ and the Church of Jesus Christ of Latter-day Saints consider themselves the continuation of the Church of Jesus Christ of Latter Day Saints established by Joseph Smith Jr. in 1832.

Reorganization
Following the murder of Joseph Smith Jr. in 1844, several church leaders claimed to be his successor. Emma Hale Smith initially supported William Marks, who ultimately declined to pursue his claim. When the majority of the church followed Brigham Young west, she remained in Nauvoo with her children. In 1860, her eldest son, Joseph Smith III, reestablished the First Presidency as leadership of the Reorganized Church of Jesus Christ of Latter-day Saints.

Notes

External links

Latter Day Saint hierarchy
Religious organizations established in 1832
 
Community of Christ